Barak Valley Engineering College (BVEC) is a state government engineering college located in Karimganj, Assam. It was established on 14 August 2017 by Assam Government at Karimganj district, Assam. It is affiliated to Assam Science and Technology University. On 2 March 2011, Chief Minister Tarun Gogoi laid the foundation stone of the Barak Valley Engineering College in Karimganj district, which was proposed by the Assam Government officially.

The college started to offer B.E. degree in Computer Science and Engineering and Electronics and Telecommunication Engineering from academic year 2017–18. The college is accredited by the All India Council for Technical Education (AICTE). The institution is affiliated to Assam Science and Technology University.

It is the fifth state government engineering college of Assam and first in Barak Valley.

History 
In 2009, the Government of Assam took the first move to set up the college. In 2017, the government started its full-fledged operation of the college under the influence of Directorate of Technical Education(DTE), Assam. The college is fully funded by the Government.

Academics 

The college offers B.Tech. courses in various fields:

 Computer Science & Engineering
 Civil Engineering
 Mechanical Engineering
 Electronics & Telecommunication Engineering

Department 
Engineering 
Computer Science & Engineering
Electronics and Telecommunication Engineering
Mechanical Engineering
Civil Engineering
Non-engineering departments
Chemistry
Physics
Mathematics

Admissions
 Students are taken in for undergraduate (B.Tech) courses through Assam Combined Entrance Examination (CEE) conducted by ASTU.
 Lateral entry into the undergraduate (B.Tech) courses is done through the Joint Lateral Entrance Examination (JLEE) conducted by ASTU.

References

External links
 

Engineering colleges in Assam
Karimganj district
2017 establishments in Assam
Educational institutions established in 2017